The Republic of Mirdita (Republika e Mirditës) was a short-lived unrecognized republic declared in northern Albania by Marka Gjoni and his followers. It existed between 17 July and 20 November 1921. Gjoni led his Roman Catholic Mirdita tribesmen in a rebellion against the Albanian regency and parliament established after the World War I. The Kingdom of Serbs, Croats and Slovenes (later Yugoslavia), and its newly enthroned King Aleksandar Karadjordjevic, backed Gjoni based on its interest of having another separatist region within Albania, weakening the newly created Albanian state and sharpening the religious antagonism.

Gjoni proclaimed in Prizren the founding of an independent Republic of Mirdita. Gjoni was the only president of the republic. As the republic violated the sovereignty of the Albanian state, Albanian government troops fought and eventually extinguished the republic. The putative government of the republic was overrun by the Albanian government, though no real persecution fell on the main leaders. Gjoni fled to Yugoslavia, but later returned to Albania and remained active in the political life of the highlands until his death in 1925.

History

Background
The region of Mirdita has been traditionally known for the Catholic resistance against the ruling Ottoman Muslims. This resistance has its roots in the 15th century, when the Mirditors fought Ottoman armies under the leadership of Gjergj Kastrioti – Skenderbeg. Furthermore, the Mirditors are said to be the direct brothers of the Dukagjini tribe, meaning both regions were directed by one ancestor. The Mirditors were successful in uniting with Kurbin, Lezhë, Dukagjin, Pukë, Shkodër, and Malësia areas in order to preserve their culture, religion, and obtain autonomy from the Ottoman Empire.

Proclamation and attempted establishment of Mirdita republic

In 1919, Prenk Bib Doda, the childless chieftain (Kapedan) of the Catholic Kapetainate of Mirdita tribe was assassinated in 1919 near the marshes of Lezha and left no clear successors. Marka Gjoni, a relative became a claimant and successor for the position of chieftain however many of the Mirdita leaders refused to acknowledge him and he lacked popularity among the tribe due to issues of cowardice shown during the First World War. He allowed Yugoslav authorities to declare on his behalf the independence of the Mirdita republic (July 1921) in Prizren, Yugoslavia. Gjoni received Yugoslav support, weapons, money, and of whom placed Wrangel's White Russian army at his service for the endeavour and the motive for independence he alleged was that the Albanian government or "Turks" were going to ban Catholicism. The events of the Mirdita republic coincided with international negotiations over finalising the Albanian-Yugoslav border which was viewed by participants as important and these discussions were ongoing during November 1921. Gjoni urged Yugoslavian authorities to take steps to secure the recognition of the Mirdita republic, while the Yugoslavs hoped that rebellion in northern Albania would have its territorial claims supported to the region. Greece gave recognition to the Mirdita republic. At the League of Nations, the Yugoslav government accused the Albanian government of being a tool of Muslim landowning elites while Albania responded that it was not a government of Muslims and represented Albanian people from all religions. The Yugoslav government disputed that the Albanian government of Tirana represented all Albanians, due to the existence of the Mirdita republic which threw in doubt Albania's status of being a country thus affecting it being a League member. The Yugoslav delegation contended that two governments existed and a unity of the people did not exist.

Great Britain, which recognised the Albanian government in November 1921, rejected Yugoslavia's position by sending through its prime minister Lloyd George multiple heated diplomatic protests to Belgrade demanding its withdrawal from disputed areas. The intervention by Great Britain was important as Yugoslav support for Gjoni ended thereafter. The British government advised the League of Nations that actions should be taken against Yugoslavia based upon Article 16 of the League's Covenant and the Conference of Ambassadors suggested sanctions. The League of Nations recognised Albania's borders to be those of 1913 with small territorial adjustments in favour of Yugoslavia. Ahmet Zog was sent to the Mirdita region by the Albanian government with a contingent of Albanian troops and irregular forces that defeated the secessionist move by 20 November 1921. Upon arrival Zog offered lenient terms of no reprisals if the rebellion ceased, while Gjoni fled to Yugoslavia. Local Mirditor elders negotiated with Zog for a deal with the central government. Mirdita was placed under state of siege, Gjoni and his followers were proclaimed traitors to Albania and other Mirditors associated with the events were punished in a government political court. Previous arrangements dating to the Ottoman period that gave Mirdita autonomy through indirect rule were abolished. After some time Marka Gjoni was allowed to return to Albania and in Mirdita was active in local affairs for a few years before his death.

Legacy 

The former territories of Mirdita Republic were shrunk in size and population by less than half, known today as Mirdita Region. Mirditë District would be created later. Other neighboring districts take stake to the annexed parts of "Old Mirdita", known by the locals only.

Government 
President: Marka Gjoni
Minister of Foreign Affairs: Anton Ashiku
Minister of War: Prenk Lleshi
Minister of Home Affairs: Zef Ndoci

See also 
Mirditë District
Former countries in Europe after 1815
Albania
Republic of Central Albania
Autonomous Province of Korçë

References

Citations

Sources

Further reading 
WorldStatesmen
Proclamation
Article on p. 6

Modern history of Albania
1921 in Albania
Former countries in the Balkans
Former unrecognized countries
Former republics
States and territories established in 1921
1921 disestablishments in Europe
Catholic rebellions
Former countries of the interwar period

de:Mirdita#Republik Mirdita